Allegiance is an American spy drama television series adapted from the Israeli series The Gordin Cell. The series premiered on February 5, 2015, on NBC.

On March 6, 2015, NBC canceled the series after five low-rated episodes. On March 12, 2015, NBC confirmed that the series would move online, and a new episode premiered in the U.S. via Hulu and NBC.com. The final episode of the series was released on April 30, 2015.

Cast

Main
 Hope Davis as Katya O'Connor, a retired Russian intelligence operative.  Her father was a KGB general who forcibly recruited her when she was 17 years old.
 Scott Cohen as Mark O'Connor, an American-born businessman who was recruited by Katya to spy for Russia.
 Gavin Stenhouse as Alex O'Connor, a gifted CIA analyst who is assigned to a joint FBI-CIA investigation into an SVR (Russian Foreign Intelligence Service) plot to destroy critical infrastructure within the United States.  Until episode 4, he had no idea about his parents' and sister's spying.  In episode 5, it is mentioned that he graduated from Princeton University with both a bachelor's and master's degree in three years.
 Margarita Levieva as Natalie O'Connor, eldest daughter of the O'Connor family. She is also an SVR spy and was recruited at age 20. She is dating Victor Dobrynin, her family's SVR handler.
 Morgan Spector as Victor Dobrynin, an SVR operative assigned to be Katya and Mark's handler when they are both reactivated. He is dating Natalie O'Connor.
 Alexandra Peters as Sarah O'Connor, youngest daughter of the O'Connor family.
 Kenneth Choi as Sam Luttrell, CIA Station Chief of New York.

Recurring
 Robert John Burke as Special Agent Brock, the FBI agent-in-charge of the joint FBI–CIA investigation.
 Floriana Lima as Special Agent Michelle Prado, an FBI agent who is partnered with Alex O'Connor on the joint FBI–CIA investigation.
 Fred Dalton Thompson as the Director of the FBI.
 Diane Farr as Elizabeth Simpson U.S. Department of Transportation, pipeline and hazardous materials safety administration.
 Giancarlo Esposito as Oscar Christoph / Marcus Bolivar / John Phillips.

Production

On January 10, 2014, NBC ordered the series to pilot under a different title Coercion.

On February 14, 2014, Gavin Stenhouse was cast as a lead role. Hope Davis and Margarita Levieva were cast as female lead roles on February 24, 2014. The pilot was later ordered to a 13-episode series to premiere mid-season under the final title Allegiance on May 6, 2014. On December 12, 2014, NBC announced that the series would premiere on February 5, 2015 following The Blacklist as a part of the "All-New NBC Thursday" and replacing Parenthood.

Filming on the series finale ended on March 15, 2015.

Episodes

Reception

Critical response
The review aggregator website Rotten Tomatoes reports a 47% approval rating with an average rating of 5.6/10 based on 32 reviews by critics.  Metacritic, which uses a weighted average, assigned a score of 57 out of 100 based on 28 reviews, indicating "mixed or average reviews".

International broadcast
The series premiered in Australia on June 30, 2015 on SoHo.

See also 
 The Americans

References

External links
 
 

2010s American drama television series
2015 American television series debuts
2015 American television series endings
American television series based on Israeli television series
English-language television shows
NBC original programming
Television series by Universal Television
Television shows set in New York City
Television shows set in Philadelphia
Television shows filmed in New York (state)
Television shows filmed in Pennsylvania